is a Japanese multinational pharmaceutical company, formed on 1 April 2005 from the merger of  and . On February 5, 2020, the company announced management changes effective from April 1, 2020.

Astellas is a member of the Mitsubishi UFJ Financial Group (MUFJ) keiretsu.

History

Early foundations
Fujisawa Shoten was started in 1894 by Tomokichi Fujisawa in Osaka, and was renamed Fujisawa Pharmaceutical Co. in 1943. Yamanouchi Yakuhin Shokai was started in 1923 by Kenji Yamanouchi in Osaka.  The company was renamed Yamanouchi Pharmaceutical Co. in 1940 and moved to Tokyo in 1942. Both companies started their overseas expansion at about the same time, opening offices in Taiwan in 1962 and 1963, respectively, and in the United States and Europe from 1977 onwards.

Recent times and mergers
Fujisawa acquired Lyphomed in 1990 and thereafter established its US R&D center in Deerfield, Illinois. Yamanouchi's R&D center in Leiderdorp was established with the acquisition of the pharmaceutical division of Royal Gist Brocades in 1991. Fujisawa and Yamanouchi combined in a "merger of equals," forming Astellas Pharma on 1 April 2005. At least some of its older products continue to be distributed under the original brand, ostensibly due to high brand-name recognition. Astellas had a collaboration agreement with CoMentis from 2008 to 2014 focused on development of beta-secretase inhibitor therapeutics for Alzheimer's disease.

In 2009, the company's tacrolimus-containing products Prograf and Advagraf showed they were prone to dosing errors within Europe, leading to serious adverse reactions among a number of patients, due to deficits in packaging and labeling, deficits corrected after a warning from the UK MHRA.

On June 9, 2010, Astellas acquired OSI Pharmaceuticals for $4.0 billion. In December 2014, Astellas expanded its 18-month-old collaboration with Cytokinetics, focusing on the R&D and commercialization of skeletal muscle activators. The companies announced they will advance the development of CK-2127107 (a fast skeletal troponin activator) into Phase II clinical trials for the treatment of spinal muscular atrophy and possibly other neuromuscular conditions. The collaboration was expected to generate more than $600 million for Cytokinetics, as well as $75 million in milestone payments. In November 2015, the company announced its move to acquire Ocata Therapeutics (formerly Advanced Cell Technology) for $379 million. The deal was completed in February 2016. Later in November 2015 the company announced it would sell its dermatology business to LEO Pharma for $725 million. In October 2016 Astellas announced it would acquire Ganymed Pharmaceuticals for $1.4 billion

In April 2017, the company announced it would acquire Belgium-based drug discovery firm Ogeda for up to a total €800 million, strengthening its late-stage pipeline with Ogeda's drug candidate, fezolinetant. In November 2017, the company announced that it exercised an option to purchase Cambridge, Massachusetts-based Mitobridge, which is developing treatments for Duchenne muscular dystrophy and age-related diseases.

In August 2018, Astellas announced it would acquire Quethera Limited for $109 million. In December 2018, the company announced it would acquire Potenza Therapeutics, Inc.

In December 2019, Astellas Pharma announced it would buy Audentes Therapeutics Inc for approximately $3 billion in cash as well as acquiring Xyphos Biosciences, Inc later in the same month. Audentes will operate as a wholly owned subsidiary within Astellas, and will serve as the Center of Excellence for the newly created Genetic Regulation Primary Focus, providing leadership for AAV pipeline advancement through commercialization, manufacturing expansion, and next-generation research initiatives. The acquisition includes Astellas gaining Xyphos’ Advanced Cellular Control through Engineered Ligands (ACCEL) technology platform.

Astellas Pharma's Smyraf (ingredient: peficitinib) obtained regulatory approval for the treatment of rheumatoid arthritis, the third oral Janus kinase (JAK) inhibitor to receive approval.

In October 2020, Astellas announced it would acquire iota Biosciences, Inc. for $127.5 million, with shareholders eligible to receive up to a further $176.5 million upon the achievement of predetermined milestones.

Acquisition history
The following is an illustration of the company's major mergers and acquisitions and historical predecessors (this is not a comprehensive list):

Controversies

In June 2016, the Association of the British Pharmaceutical Industry (ABPI) gave Astellas a year-long suspension, after complaints it had "purposely misled the PMCPA." In particular, Astellas had not fully disclosed the nature of a meeting which had purported to be a "genuine advisory board".

In May 2017, the ABPI extended the suspension by a further 12 months, based on findings that Astellas was not adequately overseeing and training nurses, and that it had failed to provide complete prescribing information for several medicines.

In June 2017, Astellas was reprimanded for "producing a large number of promotional materials, which had been used for a number of years, that did not include the required prescribing information related to some serious or common adverse reactions, warnings, and precautions, for a total of eight drugs".

In December 2018, the Prescription Medicines Code of Practice Authority (PMCPA) published their findings following an allegation that Astellas had "inappropriately awarded research funding" to a senior clinician at a British hospital, directly resulting in the hospital adopting a protocol which was subsequently abandoned less than three years later "because of poor outcomes". This report also reprimanded Astellas for failing to provide sufficient and timely information to investigators.

In April 2019, Astellas agreed to pay the United States Department of Justice $100 million to resolve allegations that it had conspired to offer kickbacks via Medicare copay foundations.

Business
Astellas' franchise areas are oncology, urology, immunology (transplantation), cardiology, and infectious disease. Priority areas for R&D are infectious diseases, diabetes, gastrointestinal diseases, oncology, and diseases of the central nervous system.

Recently noted, Astellas Venture Management has funded Oncorus, which recently raised $79.5 million in a series B financing round to move two oncolytic viruses through development.

Products
Some of the key products produced by Astellas include:
 Adenocard (adenosine injection) – Pharmacologic stress agent for myocardial perfusion scan
 Adenoscan (adenosine injection) – Pharmacologic stress agent for myocardial perfusion scan
 AmBisome (amphotericin B) – Anti-fungal – marketed with Gilead Sciences.
 Amevive (alefacept) – plaque psoriasis
 Astagraf XL (tacrolimus) – Prevention of post-transplant organ rejection
 Cresemba (isavuconazole) – Anti-fungal
 Evrenzo (roxadustat) - Anemia due to chronic kidney disease (CKD)
 Flomax (tamsulosin hydrochloride) – Benign prostatic hyperplasia (BPH)
Flomax MR capsules were discontinued in 2005, replaced by Flomaxtra XL, containing the same active ingredient
 Lexiscan (regadenoson injection) – Pharmacologic stress agent for myocardial perfusion scan
 Macugen (pegaptanib sodium) – Anti-angiogenic – marketed with Gilead Sciences in the US and Pfizer Outside of US.
 Mycamine (micafungin sodium) – Anti-fungal
 Myrbetriq (mirabegron) – Overactive bladder (OAB) – US only marketed by Pfizer Outside of US.
 Padcev (enfortumab vedotin) - Bladder cancer
 Prograf (tacrolimus) – Prevention of post-transplant organ rejection
 Protopic (tacrolimus ointment) – Atopic dermatitis (eczema)
 Symoron (methadone HCL) – Opioid replacement therapy
 Tarceva (erlotinib) – Non-small cell lung cancer and pancreatic cancer – marketed with Hoffmann-La Roche (Genentech).
 Vaprisol (conivaptan) – Hyponatremia
 Vesicare (solifenacin succinate) – Overactive bladder (OAB)
 Vibativ (telavancin) – bactericidal lipoglycopeptide – marketed with Theravance.
 Xospata (gilteritinib) – AXL receptor tyrosine kinase
 Xtandi (enzalutamide) – Prostate cancer – marketed with Pfizer.

Distribution agreements 
In 2007, the company narrowed UK distribution of Advagraf and Prograf to a sole distributor, UniChem, in reaction to pharmacist complaints about drug availability from wholesale sources. This narrow distribution was revised to three firms in 2010, covering all of its products in the UK: AAH, Alliance Healthcare, and Phoenix Healthcare Distribution.

Operations
The company's headquarters are in Tokyo, with research centers in Tsukuba and Osaka. Clinical development is centered in Northbrook, Illinois, La Jolla, California, and Leiden, Netherlands. Combined revenues of the two pre-merger companies were $7.9 billion in 2004. Worldwide the company employs about 17,000 people. The United States subsidiary of Astellas is Astellas US LLC.

The company's advertising slogans are:
 English: Leading Light for Life
 Japanese:

Further reading

References

External links

 

 
Pharmaceutical companies of Japan
Life sciences industry
Mitsubishi UFJ Financial Group
Multinational companies headquartered in Japan
Pharmaceutical companies based in Tokyo
Pharmaceutical companies established in 2005
Pharmaceutical companies of the Netherlands
Japanese brands
Japanese companies established in 2005
Companies listed on the Tokyo Stock Exchange
TOPIX 100
Companies based in Northbrook, Illinois